Luka Mkheidze (born 5 January 1996) is a French judoka of Georgian descent. Mkheidze came to France with refugee status in 2010. He won one of the bronze medals in the men's 60 kg event at the 2020 Summer Olympics held in Tokyo, Japan.

In 2021, he won the silver medal in the men's 60 kg event at the European Judo Championships held in Lisbon, Portugal. He won one of the bronze medals in his event at the 2022 Judo Grand Slam Paris held in Paris, France.

Achievements

References

External links

 
 
 

Living people
Naturalized citizens of France
Place of birth missing (living people)
French people of Georgian descent
French male judoka
Judoka at the 2019 European Games
European Games competitors for France
Judoka at the 2020 Summer Olympics
Olympic judoka of France
Olympic bronze medalists for France
Olympic medalists in judo
Medalists at the 2020 Summer Olympics
1996 births